Spain competed at the 2015 European Games, in Baku, Azerbaijan from 12 to 28 June 2015.

Medalists

Archery

Men

Women

Mixed

Badminton

Men

Women

Basketball

Spain has qualified both of the teams based on the performance at the 2014 FIBA Europe 3x3 Championships

Men's tournament
Team

Sergio de la Fuente
Álex Llorca
Nacho Martín
Juan Vasco

Group Play

Eighth Finals

Quarterfinals

Semifinals

Final

Women's tournament
Team

Vega Gimeno
Arantxa Novo
Esther Montenegro
Inmaculada Zanoguera

Group Play

Eighth Finals

Quarterfinals

Semifinals

Bronze-medal match

Beach soccer

Spain has qualified the men's team based on the performance at the 2014 Euro Beach Soccer League

Nicolás Alvarado
Salvador Ardil
Ezequiel Carrera
Francisco José Cintas
Francisco Jesús Donaire
Llorenç Gómez

Juan Manuel Martín
Antonio José Mayor
Francisco Mejías
Cristian Méndez
Francisco Raúl Mérida
Daniel Pajón

Group Play

5th–8th Position Semifinals

5th–6th Position Match

Boxing

Canoe sprint

Men

Women

Cycling

Spain has qualified for the following events based on the UCI Nations Rankings

Road

Men

Mountain biking

BMX

Diving

Fencing

Spain has qualified three quota places for the following events.

Gymnastics

Aerobic

Mixed

Artistic
Men
Team

Individual

Apparatus

Women
Team

Individual

Rhythmic

Individual

Team

Apparatus Team

Trampoline

Women

Judo 

Men

Women

Karate

Spain has a total of seven athletes after the performance at the 2015 European Karate Championships.

Sambo

Spain has been given two quota places at the Sambo events by the European Sambo Federation.

Shooting 

Men

Women

Mixed

Swimming 

Men

Women

Synchronised swimming

Spain has qualified for the following events

Table Tennis

Spain has qualified the following quota places:

Men

Women

Taekwondo

Triathlon

Spain has qualified for the following events

Volleyball

Spain has qualified for the following events

Beach volleyball

Water Polo

Spain has qualified both of the teams based on the performance at the 2013 European Junior Water Polo Championships

Men's tournament

Oriol Albacete
Jordi Chico
Alex De la Fuente
Josu Fernández
Álvaro García
Pablo Gómez de la Puente
Álvaro Granados

Guillermo Palomar
Nikolas Paúl
Josep Puig
Oriol Rodríguez
Marc Salvador
Francisco Valera

Group play

Quarterfinals

Semifinals

Final

Women's tournament

Alejandra Aznar
Carmen Baringo
Alba Bonamusa
Paula Crespí
Helena Dalmases
Sandra Domene
Laura Gómez

Blanca Goset
Mireia Guiral
Paula Leiton
Elia Montoya
Anna Roldán
Paula Rutgers

Group play

Play-offs

Semifinals

Final

Wrestling

Spain has qualified for the following events

Men's Greco-Roman

Men's freestyle

Women's freestyle

References

Nations at the 2015 European Games
European Games
2015